The ambassador from Luxembourg to India is the Grand Duchy of Luxembourg's foremost diplomatic representative in the Republic of India, and in charge of Luxembourg's diplomatic mission in India.

The embassy is in New Delhi, and was opened in 2002.

List of heads of mission

Ambassador to India

 Paul Steinmetz (2002–2007)
 Marc Courte (2007-2011)
 Gaston Stronck (2011-2014)
 Sam Schreiner (2014–2018)
 Jean Claude Kugener (2018–2021)
 Peggy Frantzen (2021–present)

India
Ambassadors of Luxembourg to India
Luxembourg